Paarl Royals is a South African professional Twenty20 franchise cricket team that first competed in the inaugural season of SA20 tournament. The team is based in Paarl, South Africa, and was formed in 2022. The team's home-ground is the Boland Park Cricket ground. The team is captained by David Miller and is coached by JP Duminy.

The franchise is owned by Manoj Badale.

Current squad
The side's squad for the first season of the competition was:
 Players with international caps are listed in bold

Administration and support staff

Statistics

Most runs

Most wickets

References

External links
 Paarl Royals at the SA20 official website.

Cricket in South Africa
2022 establishments in South Africa
Cricket clubs established in 2022
Sports clubs in South Africa
SA20
Paarl